Daniel Romanovskij (born 19 June 1996) is a Lithuanian international footballer who plays as left or right winger.

Club career
Born in Lithuanian capital Vilnius, Romanovskij has played  for FK Žalgiris, FK Žalgiris II, FK Utenis Utena, FC Stumbras and FC Stumbras II. Romanovskij has an impressive feature of being a footballer that in his first 3 years as senior, he won 3 consecutive doubles, championship and cup. Later, while playing with Stumbras, he won the 2017 Lithuanian Cup playing the final precisely against his former club.

In summer 2018 he moved abroad and signed a 3-year contract with Serbian club FK Zemun, a club where his compatriot and former teammate at Žalgiris, Justas Lasickas, had been playing on one-year loan a season earlier.

In 27 July he signed with lithuanian Banga.

International career
Romanovskij represented Lithuania at U17, U19 and U21 levels.

He made his international debut for the Lithuanian A national team in 2018.

Honours
Žalgiris
A Lyga: 2014, 2015, 2016
Lithuanian Cup: 2014, 2015, 2016
Lithuanian Supercup: 2016

Stumbras
Lithuanian Cup: 2017

References

External links
 

1996 births
Living people
Sportspeople from Vilnius
Lithuanian footballers
Lithuania international footballers
Lithuanian people of Russian descent
FK Žalgiris players
FK Utenis Utena players
FC Stumbras players
A Lyga players
I Lyga players
FK Zemun players
FC Olimpik Donetsk players
Ukrainian Premier League players
Serbian SuperLiga players
Lithuanian expatriate footballers
Expatriate footballers in Serbia
Expatriate footballers in Ukraine
Lithuanian expatriate sportspeople in Ukraine
Association football midfielders